Allison Gilbert is an American journalist and author. She is the author and co-author of five non-fiction books including the biography with Julia Scheeres of Elsie Robinson, Listen World!: How the Intrepid Elsie Robinson Became America’s Most-Read Woman.

Career

TV news
Allison Gilbert started her career in TV news. At CNN, Gilbert produced TV segments and wrote stories for CNN.com. Before CNN, she was a producer at WABC-TV and an investigative producer at WNBC-TV.

Grief and resilience
Gilbert is the author of three books on grief and has written for or been featured in many publications including CNN, The Washington Post, Today, and The Atlantic.

September 11 attacks
Gilbert was a journalist covering the September 11 attacks and went on to co-edit Covering Catastrophe: Broadcast Journalists Report September 11, a historical record of how broadcast journalists covered the attacks. Gilbert is the official narrator of the National September 11 Memorial & Museum’s historical exhibition audio tour and her voice is introduced by Robert De Niro on the museum’s “Witnessing History” tour. She is the co-executive producer of the documentary Reporting 9/11 and Why It Still Matters and host of the companion 20-part documentary series Women Journalists of 9/11: Their Stories, produced in collaboration with the National September 11 Memorial & Museum and Wondrium for the 20th anniversary of 9/11. These projects include interviews with journalists such as Savannah Guthrie, Maggie Haberman, Scott Pelley, Byron Pitts, Dana Bash, and Linda Wertheimer.

Publications

Books
 Listen, World!: How the Intrepid Elsie Robinson Became America’s Most-Read Woman with co-author Julia Scheeres (Seal Press: September 2022)
 Passed and Present: Keeping Memories of Loved Ones Alive (Seal Press: 2016)
 Parentless Parents: How the Loss of Our Mothers and Fathers Impacts the Way We Raise Our Children (Hyperion: 2011)
 Always Too Soon: Voices of Support for Those Who Have Lost Both Parents, edited by Christina Baker Kline (Seal Press: 2006)
 Covering Catastrophe: Broadcast Journalists Report September 11, co-edited with Phil Hirshkorn, Melinda Murphy, Mitchell Stephens, and Robyn Walensky; (Bonus Books: 2002)

Select essays and reporting
 The Grief Crisis Is Coming (April 2021) The New York Times
 Why Looking at a Photo Can Ease Loneliness and Grief (November 2016) O, The Oprah Magazine
 Journalist and Survivor: The Rules Blurred on 9/11 (May 2014) CNN.com

Education
 Ethical Culture Fieldston School
 Georgetown University

References 

Year of birth missing (living people)
Living people
American women television journalists
American investigative journalists
21st-century American journalists
American women non-fiction writers
21st-century American non-fiction writers
21st-century American biographers
American women biographers
CNN people
American self-help writers
People associated with the September 11 attacks